Antoine Puttaert (25 October 1919 – 2 January 2005) was a Belgian footballer. He played in nine matches for the Belgium national football team from 1944 to 1947.

References

External links
 

1919 births
2005 deaths
Belgian footballers
Belgium international footballers
Place of birth missing
Association footballers not categorized by position